This is a timeline of the British company ITV Digital Channels and its predecessors Granada Sky Broadcasting and Carlton Communications, and digital channels of other ITV-related companies. The timeline does not include events related to ITV network's flagship channel (ITV1 / STV / UTV).

1990s 

 1996
 1 September – Carlton Food Network launches. It broadcasts on weekday afternoons on cable.
 1 October – Granada Sky Broadcasting, in conjunction with BSkyB, launches four channels. They are Granada Plus, which shows programming from the archives of Granada Television and London Weekend Television, lifestyle channel Granada Good Life which is split into four three-hour segments - Granada Food & Wine, Granada Health & Beauty, Granada TV High Street and Granada Home & Garden - men's channel Granada Men & Motors and Granada Talk TV which broadcasts debates and chat shows.
 1 November – A joint venture between Scottish Television and BSkyB results in the launch of Sky Scottish.

 1997
 14 February – Entertainment channel Carlton Select is launched. It broadcasts during the evening, sharing space with Carlton Food Network and is also only broadcast on cable. It replaces SelecTV which Carlton acquired from Pearson Television. SelecTV had been broadcasting on cable since June 1995.
 31 August – Granada Talk TV stops broadcasting.

 1998
 1 May – Granada Good Life is renamed Granada Breeze and the change sees the abolition of the four segments. 
 31 May – Sky Scottish stops broadcasting because the channel having failed to meet its financial targets.
 15 November – The public launch of digital terrestrial TV in the UK takes place with the launch of ONdigital and as part of the 19-channel line-up, Carlton creates three new channels for the platform, Carlton Cinema, Carlton Kids and Carlton World and Granada, in conjunction with Littlewoods, opens Shop!, a basic shopping channel.
 7 December – ITV2 is launched but only in England and Wales. It operates as a single service with no regional content. It is a mixed genre channel and as well as being available on ONdigital, it is also carried on cable.

 1999
 4 January – GMTV2 launches during the breakfast downtime of ITV2.
 30 April – Scottish Television launches S2.
 28 June – Ulster Television launches TV You (later UTV2).
 September – Champions ON 28 and Champions ON 99 launch on the ONdigital service to provide live and recorded coverage of the UEFA Champions League.

2000s 
 2000
 31 January – Carlton Kids stops broadcasting.
 1 February – Carlton World stops broadcasting.
 1 March – Carlton Select stops broadcasting. Its hours are given over to Carlton Food Network (CFN), enabling them to become a full-time channel.
 1 May – ONrequest launches to provide pay-per-view content for OnDigital viewers.
 1 August – The ITN News Channel goes on the air. 
 September – ONsport launches. It replaces Champions on 28 and Champions on 99 which had reflected the channel numbers these were broadcast on. These channels were rebranded respectively as ONsport 1 and ONsport 2 after ONdigital had purchased rights to the ATP Masters Series tennis. Whilst ONsport 1 broadcasts 24 hours a day, ONsport 2 timeshares with Carlton Cinema and is only on air to provide coverage of an alternate Champions League match.

 2001
 May – Following the signing of a joint venture with supermarket chain Sainsbury's, Carlton Food Network is renamed Taste CFN. 
 11 July – Carlton and Granada relaunch OnDigital as ITV Digital in an attempt to better compete with Sky. 
 27 July – S2 closes and consequently ITV2 starts broadcasting in Scotland.
 11 August – The ITV Sport Channel launches. It replaces ONsport and is a premium service rather than an add-on for ITV Digital customers. It fails to get carriage on Sky and Telewest but is available on NTL. 
 1 December – Taste CFN stops broadcasting.

 2002
 22 January – UTV2 stops broadcasting. Consequently, ITV2 launches in Northern Ireland.
 8 April – Shop! closes.
 23 April – ITV Select, launched originally as ONrequest, closes.
 30 April – Granada Breeze stops broadcasting.
 12 May – Following the collapse of ITV Digital, the ITV Sports Channel stops broadcasting.
 30 September – ITV purchases ITN's 65% stake in its news channel and relaunches it as the ITV News Channel.

 2003
 31 March – Carlton Cinema stops broadcasting.

 2004
 April – The newly created ITV plc purchases NTL's 35% stake in the ITV News Channel.
 1 November – ITV3 launches, replacing Plus which closes a few hours prior to ITV3's launch. Earlier that day ITV had bought out BSkyB's stake in Granada Sky Broadcasting.
 8 November – ITV Digital Channels Ltd is formally launched following the closure of Granada Sky Broadcasting.

2005
 1 November – ITV4 launches but only as a part-time channel. Consequently, ITV2 relaunches as an entertainment channel following the transfer of sports coverage from ITV2 to the new channel.
 23 December – ITV News Channel stops broadcasting at 6pm. Poor ratings in comparison to BBC News 24 and Sky News and ITV's desire to reuse the channel's allocation on Freeview were cited as the reasons.

 2006
 11 March – The CITV Channel launches on Freeview, Home Choice and Telewest. It starts broadcasting on Sky on 8 May and on NTL on 6 June.
 19 April – ITV Play launches.
 June – ITV launches a trial high-definition channel, primarily to show matches from the 2006 FIFA World Cup.
 30 October – ITV2 and ITV3 launch +1 channels.
 30 November – The ITV HD trial broadcast ends.

 2007
 13 March – ITV announces that ITV Play will permanently close down following recent concerns over participation television. On 16 March, its slot on Freeview is taken by the recently launched ITV2+1.

 2008
 5 February – ITV4 becomes a 24-hour channel.
 17 July – ITV HD launches as a full-time service.
 1 December – ITV4 +1 launches.

 2009
 No events.

2010s
2010
 1 April – Men & Motors and the full-time version of ITV HD stop broadcasting.
 2 April – the HD version of ITV1 launches.
 7 October – ITV2 HD launches.
 15 November – ITV3 HD and ITV4 HD launch.

2011
 11 January – ITV +1 is launched.
 14 November – ITV and JML Direct launch home shopping channel The Zone.

2012
 No events.

2013
 1 October – The Zone becomes The Store.

2014
 2 June – STV launches the first of its local television channels, STV Glasgow.
 9 June – ITV Encore launches, showing recent ITV drama productions.
 8 October – Reality channel ITVBe launches. Consequently, ITV2 is repositioned as a youth-focused entertainment channel.

2015
 1 January – UTV Ireland launches in the Republic of Ireland.
 12 January – STV launches its second local television channel, STV Edinburgh.
 March – STV is awarded three more local licenses, to cover Aberdeen, Ayr and Dundee.

2016
 No events.

2017
 1 January – UTV Ireland closes and is replaced by be3.
 4 February – Following ITV's return to covering live boxing, the channel launches a pay-per-view channel ITV Box Office.
 24 April – STV merges its local channels and relaunches them as a single channel called STV2.

2018
 1 May – ITV Encore closes as a linear channel after four years on air. It continues as an on-demand service.
 30 June – STV2 stops broadcasting following That's TV's acquisition of the assets of STV's STV2 channel.

2019
 January – ITV and JML Direct close The Store.

2020s
2020
 24 January – ITV announces that it has closed its pay-per-view service ITV Box Office.
 29 July – Merit launches as an evening service showing gardening and cookery programmes but less than a month after its launch, ITV sells the channel to Sky Group.

2021
 No events.

2022
 No events.

2023
 September – The CITV Channel will close as part of ITV's plans to transition its children's output to a predominantly online model. A morning block of children's programming will be introduced on ITV2, serving primarily to promote the online ITVX offering, and the LittleBe strand within ITVBe will continue.

See also 
 Timeline of ITV

References

ITV timelines
Television in the United Kingdom by year